Giorgi Levanovich Sheliya (born 11 December 1988) is a Russian professional footballer of Georgian origin. He plays as a goalkeeper for Akhmat Grozny.

Club career
On 11 January 2019, Sheliya was released from his FC Ufa contract by mutual consent. Five days later, 16 January 2019, Sheliya signed a 2.5-year contract with FC Tambov. On 1 August 2020, Sheliya left Tambov to sign for Akhmat Grozny on a two-year contract, with the option of an additional year. On 24 May 2022, Sheliya extended his contract with Akhmat until the end of the 2023–24 season.

Career statistics

Club

References

External links
 
 

1988 births
Footballers from Moscow
Russian sportspeople of Georgian descent
Living people
Russian footballers
Association football goalkeepers
FC Dynamo Bryansk players
FC Baltika Kaliningrad players
FC Yenisey Krasnoyarsk players
FC Ufa players
FC Tambov players
FC Akhmat Grozny players
Russian Premier League players
Russian First League players
Russian Second League players